Warnockia is a genus from the family Lamiaceae, first described in 1996. It contains only one known species, Warnockia scutellarioides, the prairie brazosmint, native to the south-central United States (Texas and Oklahoma) and northern Mexico (Coahuila).

Etymology 
The genus name honors Barton Warnock, a 20th-century Texan botanist.

The specific epithet scutellarioides (suffixed with ) means "Scutellaria-like", referring to a resemblance to another genus in the Lamiaceae.

It was also called the prairie brazoria, as it was formerly placed in the genus Brazoria.

References

Lamiaceae
Monotypic Lamiaceae genera
Flora of Texas
Flora of Oklahoma
Flora of Coahuila